Grayson McCall (born December 13, 2000) is an American football quarterback with the Coastal Carolina Chanticleers.

Early years
At the age of 12, McCall joined a traveling Little League all-star baseball team that played in a televised tournament in Cooperstown, New York. McCall decided to quit baseball before high school. McCall attended Porter Ridge High School in Indian Trail, North Carolina. During his high school career, he passed for 3,863 yards with 34 touchdowns and rushed for 3,003 yards and 41 touchdowns. He was listed as a two-star recruit and the 2889th player coming out of high school in the class of 2019. He committed to Coastal Carolina University on December 19, 2018 to play college football over offers from Army, Chattanooga, Eastern Kentucky, and Gardner-Webb.

College career
McCall played in two games his first year at Coastal Carolina in 2019 and took a redshirt. He completed all four of his pass attempts for 25 yards and a touchdown. He became the team's starting quarterback in 2020.

During the 2020 NCAA football season, Grayson McCall made a name for himself by leading the last place projected Coastal Carolina football team to its first-ever undefeated regular season, first-ever appearance on the AP and Coaches Poll peaking at number 12, first-ever Co-Sun Belt conference championship, as well as its first-ever bowl game appearance in the 2020 Cure Bowl where they suffered their only loss on the season. Starting all twelve games, McCall led Coastal Carolina to wins in big matchups between undefeated teams against Louisiana and BYU. The latter game is considered to be the biggest win in program history and was nicknamed Mormons vs. Mullets. After the conclusion of the 2020 season McCall was named the Sun Belt Conference Player of the Year, Sun Belt Freshman of the Year, received First-team All-Sun Belt honors and nominations for the Davey O'Brien Award and Manning Award.

On December 12, 2022, it was announced that he would enter the NCAA transfer portal. ESPN reported on January 1, 2023 that McCall had exited the portal and would remain at Coastal for the 2023 season.

Statistics

Personal life 
McCall has an older brother and a sister.

Notes 
NCAA record for passer rating in a season

References

External links
Coastal Carolina Chanticleers bio

Living people
Players of American football from North Carolina
American football quarterbacks
Coastal Carolina Chanticleers football players
People from Union County, North Carolina
2000 births